Ojugbelu Arere (1070–1105 AD) was the first Olowo of Owo, a city in Ondo State, southwestern Nigeria.
He was a son to Okanbi the only son of Oduduwa Olofin Adimula known as the ancestor of the Yoruba race whose origin was traced to Ile Ife. The name, Owo, meaning Respect was coined from his intrigue attitude. He was succeeded by Olowo Ajagbusi Ekun

History
Ojugbelu was a son of Oduduwa, the ancestor of Yoruba race whose origin could be traced to Ile Ife, the home of the Yoruba people. Due to his kind gesture and intrigue characters, he was accompanied to Owo by 12 Ighare Iloros who later settled at iloro quarters of Owo.
When he came to Owo from Ile Ife, he settled on top of a hill known as Okitisegbo, a dominant feature of the city of Owo.

See also
Olowo of Owo

References

Nigerian traditional rulers
Yoruba monarchs
People from Ondo State
Olagbegi family
11th-century Nigerian people
11th-century monarchs in Africa